Princess , born , was a prominent figure in the Meiji era, and the first Japanese woman to receive a college degree. She was born into a traditional samurai household which supported the Tokugawa shogunate during the Boshin War. As a child, she survived the monthlong siege known as the Battle of Aizu in 1868, and lived briefly as a refugee.

In 1871, Yamakawa was one of five girls chosen to accompany the Iwakura Mission to America and spend ten years receiving an American education. Yamakawa lived in the household of Leonard Bacon in New Haven, Connecticut, becoming particularly close with his youngest daughter Alice Mabel Bacon. She learned English and graduated from Hillhouse High School, then attended Vassar College, the first nonwhite student at that fledgling women's university. She graduated with the Vassar College class of 1882, earning a B.A., magna cum laude. After graduation, she remained a few more months to study nursing, and finally returned to Japan in October 1882.

When she first returned to Japan, Yamakawa looked for educational or government work, but her options were limited, especially because she could not read or write Japanese. In April 1882, she accepted a marriage proposal from Ōyama Iwao, a wealthy and important general, despite the fact that he had fought on the opposing side of the Battle of Aizu. As her husband was promoted, she was elevated in rank to become Countess, Marchioness, and finally Princess Ōyama in 1905. She was a prominent figure in Rokumeikan society, advising the Empress on Western customs. She also used her social position as a philanthropist to advocate for women's education and volunteer nursing. She assisted in the founding of the Peeresses' School for high-ranking ladies, and the Women's Home School of English, which would later become Tsuda University. She died in 1919 when the 1918 flu pandemic reached Tokyo.

Early life
Yamakawa Sakiko was born on February 24, 1860, in Aizu, an isolated and mountainous region in what is now the Fukushima Prefecture.

Yamakawa was raised in a traditional samurai household in the town of Wakamatsu, in a several-acre compound near the northern gate of Tsuruga Castle. She did not attend school, but was taught to read and write at home, as part of a rigorous education in etiquette and obedience based on the eighteenth-century neo-Confucian text Onna Daigaku (Greater Learning for Women).

Battle of Aizu
In 1868–1869, Yamakawa's family was on the losing side of the Boshin War. The Boshin War was a civil war at the end of Japan's bakumatsu ("end of military government"), in which pro-shogunate forces resisted the new imperial rule that began with the 1867 Meiji Restoration. The conflict reached Yamakawa's hometown with the Battle of Aizu in late 1868. On October 8, 1868, when Yamakawa was eight, imperial forces invaded and burned her hometown of Wakamatsu. Yamakawa took shelter within the walls of Tsuruga Castle with her mother and sisters. Several hundred people from other samurai families instead committed ritual suicide, in what would become a famous instance of mass suicide. This invasion marked the beginning of a monthlong siege, which came to be a symbol of "heroic and desperate resistance." It was during the Battle of Aizu that the Byakkotai (White Tiger Brigade), a group of teenage fighters, famously committed mass suicide under the mistaken belief that the castle had fallen. 

The 600 women and children inside the castle, led by Matsudaira Teru, formed workgroups to cook, clean, and make gun cartridges, as well as nursing nearly 1,500 wounded soldiers. One of Yamakawa's sisters attempted to join Nakano Takeko's , but on her mother's orders remained inside the castle making gun cartridges. Yamakawa herself, age eight, carried supplies for the cartridge makers. Toward the end of the siege, Yamakawa's mother sent her and other girls to fly kites as a gesture of defiance while imperial cannons bombarded the castle and the women smothered the shells with wet quilts. One shell which was not smothered in time exploded near her, wounding Yamakawa's neck with shrapnel, and killing her sister-in-law Toseko.

After the battle

The siege ended with the castle's surrender on November 7, 1868. Yamakawa was taken to a nearby prisoner camp with her mother and sisters, where they were held for a year. In the spring of 1870, they were exiled to the newly created Tonami District (an area that is now part of the Toyama Prefecture). The 17,000 refugees exiled there had no experience of farming, and the winter saw shortages of food, shelter, and firewood which threatened Yamakawa's family with starvation. Yamakawa, turning eleven, spread night soil on the fields and scavenged for shellfish.

Education in America

Departure with the Iwakura Mission 

In December 1871, when she was eleven years old, Yamakawa was sent to the United States for study, as part of the Iwakura Mission. Yamakawa was one of five girls sent to spend ten years studying Western ways for the benefit of Japan, after which she was to return and pass on her knowledge to other Japanese women and to her children, in accordance with the Meiji philosophy of "Good Wife, Wise Mother". The other girls were Yoshimasu Ryo (age 14), Ueda Tei (14), Nagai Shige (10) and Tsuda Ume (6). All five girls were from samurai families on the losing side of the Boshin War. The initiative was a "pet project" of Kiyotaka Kuroda, who initially received no applicants in response to his recruitment efforts, despite the generous funding offered: all the girls' living expenses would be paid for the decade, plus a generous stipend. In response to Kuroda's second call for girls to be educated in America, Yamakawa's eldest brother Hiroshi, acting as head of the household, nominated her. Hiroshi was familiar with Kuroda, since his and Yamakawa's brother Kenjiro had recently left for his own education in America in January 1871, with Kuroda's assistance. Hiroshi may have nominated his sister due to her independent spirit and academic strengths, or out of simple financial need. The five girls chosen were the only applicants.

The meaning of the new name could indicate disappointment that Yamakawa was being sent away from Japan, with the first character meaning , as if Yamakawa had been thrown away. But the name could also indicate a positive hope:  is one of the Three Friends of Winter which flourish even in harsh conditions, and it sounds like , suggesting that her mother  her youngest daughter to the government mission while awaiting her safe return.

Before leaving Japan, Yamakawa and the others were the first samurai-class girls to be granted an audience with the Empress Haruko, on November 9, 1871. They departed with the rest of the Iwakura Mission on December 23, 1871 aboard the steamship America, chaperoned by Elida DeLong (wife of the American diplomat Charles E. DeLong), who spoke no Japanese). After a stormy and difficult journey, they arrived in San Francisco on January 15, 1872. Yamakawa and the other girls spent two weeks in San Francisco, largely solitary in their hotel room but the subjects of intense newspaper coverage. Americans typically spelled her name as Stemats Yamagawa, and referred to her and the other girls as "Japanese princesses". After two weeks in San Francisco, the Iwakura Mission embarked on a monthlong cross-country train tour, arriving in Washington, DC on February 29, where Charles Lanman (secretary to Arinori Mori) took custody of the girls. Yamakawa lived briefly with Mrs. Lanman's sister, a Mrs. Hepburn, then in May 1872 all five girls were moved to their own house with a governess, to study English and piano.

By October, however, they had separated: Yoshimasu and Ueda returned to Japan, Tsuda moved in with the Lanmans, and on October 31, 1872 Nagai and Yamakawa were moved to New Haven, Connecticut. In New Haven, Yamakawa's elder brother Kenjirō was studying at Yale University. To ensure that Nagai and Yamakawa practiced their English, they were placed in separate households, Nagai living with the minister John S. C. Abbott and Yamakawa living with the minister Leonard Bacon. Yamakawa would spend the next ten years as part of the Bacon family, growing particularly close with his youngest daughter of fourteen children, Alice Mabel Bacon. Likely due to the Bacons' influence, Yamakawa converted to Christianity.

Yamakawa attended Grove Hall Seminary, a primary school for girls, with Alice Bacon. In 1875, Yamakawa passed the entrance exam for Hillhouse High School, a prestigious public school, and began her studies there. She attended the 1876 Centennial Exposition in Philadelphia with both Nagai and Tsuda, a rare reunion. In April 1877, Yamakawa graduated from Hillhouse High School.

Vassar 
Yamakawa began her studies at Vassar College in September 1878, the fourteenth year of the still-new women's college. To her regret, the Bacons couldn't afford to send Alice to college, but she was reunited with Nagai. The two of them were the first nonwhite students at the school, and the first Japanese women to enroll in any college. Nagai enrolled as a special student in the music department, while Yamakawa pursued a full four-year bachelor's degree.

While at school, Yamakawa began styling her name as Stematz Yamakawa, using the American name order and a spelling which matched the pronunciation of her name. Her teachers included Henry Van Ingen and Maria Mitchell. During her time at Vassar, she studied Latin, German, Greek, math, natural history, composition, literature, drawing, chemistry, geology, history, and philosophy. She also mastered chess and whist. Yamakawa was a reserved and ambitious student, whose marks were among the highest in the class. She was also well-liked by her classmates. Around this time, Yamakawa's sister Misao moved from Japan to Russia; Misao wrote letters in French to Yamakawa, which Yamakawa's classmates translated and helped her reply to. Yamakawa was elected class president for 1879, and invited to join the literary club of the Shakespeare Society, which was "reserved for students of formidable intellect." In 1880, she was a marshal for the college's Founder's Day celebration. In June 1881, Nagai returned to Japan. The ten-year period of the girls' educational mission had ended, but Yamakawa extended her stay to complete her degree. In her senior year, she was named president of the Philalethean Society, the largest social organization at Vassar.

Yamakawa graduated from Vassar College with a B.A., magna cum laude, on June 14, 1882. Her thesis was on "British Foreign Policy Toward Japan," and she was chosen to give a commencement speech on the topic at her class's graduation. After graduation, Yamakawa studied nursing at the Connecticut Training School For Nurses in New Haven in July and August. She and Tsuda (who had also extended her stay, to complete a high school degree) finally departed for Japan in October 1882. They travelled by rail to San Francisco, whence they left aboard the steamship Arabic on October 31. After a rough three-week journey across the Pacific, Yamakawa arrived in Yokohama on November 20, 1882.

Marriage and family 
When she first returned to Japan, Yamakawa looked for educational or government work, but her options were limited, especially because she could not read or write Japanese. Yamakawa initially expressed in her letters a resolution to remain unmarried and pursue an intellectual life, turning down at least three proposals. As she struggled to find work, however, she wrote that Japanese culture made marriage necessary, and gave more serious consideration to her suitors.

In January 1882, Yamakawa wrote to Alice Bacon that one of the marriage proposals she had declined was from someone "I might have married for money and position but I resisted the temptation," whom she later revealed to have been Ōyama Iwao. At this time, Ōyama was 40 years old, with three young daughters from a first marriage which had just ended with his wife's death in childbirth. He was also a wealthy and important general in the Imperial Japanese Army who had lived in Europe for three years, spoke French, and sought an intelligent and cosmopolitan wife. As a former Satsuma retainer, his military activity included serving as an artilleryman during the bombardment of Yamakawa's hometown of Aizu. He later liked to joke that Yamakawa had made the bullet which struck him during that battle.

In February 1882, Yamakawa played Portia in an amateur production of the final two acts of The Merchant of Venice at a large party, which inspired Iwao to repeat his proposal. This time, he sent a formal request to her brothers, who were shocked. They immediately rejected him on Yamakawa's behalf because, as a Satsuma man, he was an enemy of Yamakawa's Aizu family. After several personal visits from Tsugumichi Saigo, a ranking Satsuma leader, Yamakawa's brothers were persuaded to let her decide. In April 1882, Yamakawa decided to accept him. They married in a small ceremony on November 8, 1883. At her marriage, Yamakawa became known as Ōyama Sutematsu or Madame Ōyama. 

Ōyama Iwao left Japan to study Prussian military systems early in 1884, relieving Ōyama Sutematsu of the social duties of a minister's wife for the year he was away. In July 1884, the Peerage Act of 1884 made them Count and Countess Ōyama. Ōyama Iwao left Japan again in 1894, at the head of Japan's Second Army, for the First Sino-Japanese War. When the war concluded eight months later, the American press credited Ōyama Sutematsu's influence for Japan's superiority to China. After the war, Ōyama Iwao was promoted, and the couple became Marquess and Marchioness Ōyama. Ōyama Iwao served again in the Russo-Japanese War beginning in 1904, commanding troops in Manchuria. At the end of the war in 1905, his rank was raised again, to Prince, and Ōyama Sutematsu finally became the "Japanese princess" which the American newspapers had once mistakenly called her, with her title becoming Princess Ōyama. In 1915, the Ōyamas attended the enthronement of Emperor Taishō and received a memorial badge as guests to the ceremony of accession.

During the Ōyamas' marriage, they had two daughters, Hisako (born November 1884, later Baroness Ida Hisako) and Nagako (born prematurely in 1887, lived only two days), and two sons, Takashi (winter 1886 – April 1908) and Kashiwa (born June 1889). Ōyama Sutematsu was also a step-mother to Ōyama Iwao's three daughters from his first marriage: Nobuko (c. 1876 – May 1896) and two younger girls. Despite the fact that Ōyama Sutematsu was not motivated by love when she accepted Ōyama Iwao's proposal, her biographer Janice P. Nimura calls their marriage "unusually happy," with Ōyama Sutematsu as the intellectual equal and helpmeet of her husband.

Depiction in The Cuckoo 
Beginning in 1898, a personal tragedy in Ōyama's household became the subject of a bestselling novel, in which Ōyama was depicted as a wicked stepmother. Author Kenjirō Tokutomi's novel , or Nami-ko, written under the pen name Rōka Tokutomi, is based on the marriage and death of Ōyama Nobuko, one of Ōyama Iwao's daughters with his first wife. Ōyama Nobuko married Mishima Yatarō in 1893, a love match which also united two powerful families. The winter after their marriage, Nobuko became ill with tuberculosis. Mishima's mother insisted that he divorce her, although he felt it was wrong, on the grounds that Nobuko would no longer be healthy enough to bear the heir which was necessary for an only son. While Nobuko was being nursed in the countryside, her parents agreed to a divorce, and the marriage was dissolved in the fall of 1895. Nobuko was moved back to her parents' house in Tokyo, where they built a new wing of their house for her to prevent transmission of the illness. Ōyama Sutematsu was the subject of unsympathetic gossip for isolating her stepdaughter, which was seen as a punishing exile. Nobuko died in May 1896, age twenty.

Tokutomi published his story based on these events in the newspaper Kokumin shinbun from November 1898 to May 1899. Tokutomi revised the story, and published it as a standalone book in 1900, which is when it became one of the most successful novels at the time, a major bestseller popular across many social groups for its elegant language and tear-jerking scenes. The novel is "most often remembered as a novel that protests the victimization of women, particularly the victimization of young brides," blaming the Meiji era family system known as ie for the tragedy. In presenting this moral, the novel depicts the young couple in idealized terms, and is moderately sympathetic toward the character based on Ōyama Iwao, but demonizes the characters based on Mishima's mother and on Ōyama Sutematsu. Ōyama Sutematsu's character is presented as jealous of her own stepdaughter, and a corrupting Western influence in her family.

Promotion of women's education and nursing 

After her marriage, Ōyama took on the social responsibilities of a government official's wife, and advised the Empress on western customs, holding the official title of "Advisor on Westernization in the Court." She also advocated for women's education and encouraged upper-class Japanese women to volunteer as nurses. She frequently hosted American visitors to advance Japanese-American relations, including Alice Bacon, the geographer Ellen Churchill Semple and the novelist Fannie Caldwell Macaulay. In 1888, Ōyama was the subject of negative press from Japanese conservatives, and withdrew somewhat from public life. Positive press in 1895, at the conclusion of the First Sino-Japanese War (in which her husband had military victories and she had philanthropic success), returned her to the public eye.

Education 
Ōyama assisted Tsuda and Hirobumi Ito in establishing the Peeresses' School in Tokyo for high-ranking ladies, which opened on October 5, 1885. It was overseen by the new minister of education, Arinori Mori, who had frequently met with the girls of the Iwakura Mission while in America. In its first years, the school was a relatively conservative institution, where aristocratic students dressed in formal court dress and studied Japanese, Chinese literature, English or French, and history alongside the less academic subjects of morals, calligraphy, drawing, sewing, tea ceremony, flower arrangement, household management, and formal etiquette. From 1888–1889, Alice Bacon joined the school as an English teacher. At this point, the school began requiring Western dress for students.

In 1900, she was a co-founder with Bacon and Tsuda Ume of the Women's Home School of English (or Joshi Eigaku Juku), to teach advanced studies and progressive Western ideals in English. At that time, women's only option for advanced study was the Women's Higher Normal School in Tokyo, which taught in Japanese and provided a more conservative curriculum. While Tsuda and Bacon worked as teachers, Ōyama served as a patron of the school.

Philanthropy 
Ōyama also promoted the idea of philanthropy (not a typical part of aristocratic Japanese life) to high-ranking Japanese ladies. In 1884, she hosted the first charity bazaar in Japan, raising funds for Tokyo's new Charity Hospital. Despite skepticism of the concept in the Japanese press, and suggestions that the activity was not ladylike, the bazaar was a financial success and became an annual event.

In addition to promoting monetary charity, Ōyama was active in volunteer nursing. She was Director of the Ladies Relief Association and the Ladies Volunteer Nursing Association, President of the Ladies Patriotic Association, and Chairman of the Japanese Red Cross Society. At the outbreak of the First Sino-Japanese War in 1894, she formed a committee of sixty aristocratic ladies to raise funds and gather supplies for the troops. Ōyama herself rolled bandages for the Red Cross during this war, and worked again as a volunteer nurse during the Russo-Japanese War from 1904 to 1905.

Death
At Ōyama Iwao's death on December 10, 1916, Ōyama Sutematsu made her final retreat from public life, retiring to live in their son Kashiwa's household. She was not involved with the Red Cross during World War I. When the 1918 flu pandemic reached Tokyo in early 1919, Ōyama sent her family to the countryside in Nasushiobara, but remained in Tokyo herself to oversee the Women's Home School of English (Joshi Eigaku Juku) and seek a replacement president after Tsuda's retirement. She fell ill on February 6, and died of related pneumonia on February 18, 1919.

Gallery

Bibliography

Notes

Citations

General references

Further reading
  Kuno is Yamakawa's great granddaughter.

External links 

 Oyama Sutematsu in Vassar's special collections.
 Photo gallery collected by Janice P. Nimura.

1860 births
1919 deaths
Deaths from Spanish flu
Members of the Iwakura Mission
People from Aizu
People of Meiji-period Japan
Vassar College alumni
Japanese socialites